Paenarthrobacter ureafaciens is a bacterial species of the genus Paenarthrobacter. Polar lipid profile of this species is an unknown.

The nylon-eating bacteria, Paenarthrobacter ureafaciens KI72, is considered by the NCBI database and Genome Taxonomy Database to be a member of this species.

References

External links
Type strain of Paenarthrobacter ureafaciens at BacDive -  the Bacterial Diversity Metadatabase

Micrococcaceae